Beside This Brief Hexagonal is the debut album by rock band Roadside Monument.

Track listing
 "Oh So Fabled" – 3:45
 "Seed" – 2:48
 "A Girl Named Actually" – 3:17
 "Still" – 3:25
 "Prozac Princess" – 5:45
 "Lobbyest" – 4:56
 "Immersion" – 3:02
 "Greek Tragedy" – 3:56
 "Boasting In Weakness" – 2:38
 "Mothered Others" – 6:23

Roadside Monument albums
1996 debut albums
Tooth & Nail Records albums